The 2016 Yukon Men's Curling Championship was held January 15 to 17 at the Whitehorse Curling Club in Whitehorse, Yukon. The winning Bob Smallwood team represented the Yukon at the 2016 Tim Hortons Brier.

Smallwood qualified for his second straight Brier on the last day of competition, defeating the only other undefeated team, the Matthew Blandford rink.

Teams
Six teams entered the event:

Standings

Scores

January 15
Draw 1
Blandford 13-2 Balsam  
Paslawski 9-2 Mikkelsen 
Smallwood 9-7 Wallingham

Draw 2
Smallwood 7-3 Paslawski  
Blandford 9-8 Wallingham
Mikkelsen 8-7 Balsam

January 16
Draw 3
Wallingham 12-2 Balsam 
Smallwood 7-6 Mikkelsen
Blandford 14-9 Paslawski

Draw 4
Blandford 10-2 Mikkelsen
Paslawski 9-8 Wallingham 
Smallwood 9-2 Balsam

January 17
Draw 5
Smallwood 9-6 Blandford  
Paslawski 8-3 Balsam  
Wallingham 4-3 Mikkelsen

References

External links
Results

2016 Tim Hortons Brier
Curling in Yukon
Sport in Whitehorse
2016 in Yukon